"Andante, Andante" is a song recorded by Swedish pop group ABBA for the album Super Trouper. It was released as a single in only two countries: El Salvador and Argentina. It was written by members Benny Andersson and Björn Ulvaeus on April 9, 1980, at Polar Music studios. Initially, this song was called "Hold Me Close". Anni-Frid Lyngstad handles the lead vocals.

The lyrics were translated into Spanish by Buddy and Mary McCluskey and recorded in October 1980 at Polar Music studios. This song was released for the first time on the album Super Trouper - the Latin America version as track number 4 and it was reused on the album, ABBA Oro as track number 12. "'Andante Andante' is a love song, and the repeated musical term of the title means gently, slowly or at a walking pace in Italian." The Abba tribute choir "Andante Andante", founded by Allison Pyke in 2004, takes its name from this song. The Herald describes "Andante, Andante" as having an "Italian" flavour.

Other recordings
 Thorleifs recorded an instrumental version on their 1992 album Med dej vill jag leva.
 Anni-Frid Lyngstad recorded a solo version of the song in Spanish in 2017 with Cuban-American trumpeter Arturo Sandoval. This version was released as part of Sandoval's album Ultimate Duets in 2018.

Charts

Mamma Mia! Here We Go Again version
Lily James (Young Donna) recorded "Andante, Andante" for the soundtrack of Mamma Mia! Here We Go Again. Her version was released on July 13, 2018, alongside the rest of the soundtrack, by Capitol and Polydor Records. It was produced by Benny Andersson.

Charts

Certifications

References

1980 singles
1980 songs
ABBA songs
Macaronic songs
RCA Records singles
Songs written by Benny Andersson and Björn Ulvaeus